Sindhu Bhairavi is a raga in Hindustani and Carnatic classical music, belonging to the Asavari thaat. In Carnatic music it is a Janya raga of the 8th melakartha raga Hanumatodi.

The raga brings Viraham (separation), Shokam (sorrow), Karunam (compassion) and Bhakthi (devotion) rasas. In Carnatic music it is a Bhashangaraga, in which all the 12 notes are applicable.

Sindhu Bhairavi is not to be confused with other similarly named ragas such as Sindhi Bhairavi, Sindh, Sindhura and Sindhura Bhairavi.

Theory
Arohana: 

Avarohana: 

Vadi: 

Samavadi:

Popular compositions
Popular carnatic compositions in the raga are:
 Vinnum mannum - Subramania Bharati
 Venkatachala Nilayam, Tamboori meetidava, Vrindavanave Mandira, Tirupati Venkataramana, Harihara ninnanu, Elliruvano Ranga, Kai Meeri Hoda Matige By Purandara Dasa
 Narasimhanembo Devanu is a long and beautiful composition of Purandara Dasa which contains the full story of Narasimha charitre is sung in Sindhubhairavi
 Krishnana Kolalina Kare By P T Narasimhachar
 Dummi Salenni, Govinda Gopala Gopika By Vadiraja Tirtha
 Enu Karanadinda, Sharanu Sheshachala By Vijaya Dasa
 Vishweshwar Darshan, Bhaja Bhaja, Ramachandra Prabhu – Maharaja Swathi Thirunal
 Kalyana Gopalam – Narayana Theertha
 Manadhirkugandhadhu – Thanjavur Sankara Iyer
 Pankajaksha Pahi – Thulaseevanam
 Kantamam – Mayuram Viswanatha Sastri
 Pahi Pahi Gajanana – Sri Ganapathy Sachchidananda Swamiji
 Thillana – Lalgudi Jayaraman

"Sawan mor moharaan", from Sham Churasi Gharana, by Ustad Salamat Ali Khan and his son Ustad Shafaqt Salam Ali Khan is one of the most popular composition in this raag.

Film Songs

Language:Tamil

Language:Hindi

Notes

References

Sources

External links
 

Bhairavi
Janya ragas